Siletz Dee-ni may refer to:
Confederated Tribes of Siletz Indians, a federally recognized Indian tribe of Oregon
Tolowa language, the traditional language of the tribe

See also
Siletz language

Language and nationality disambiguation pages